Tillingham is a small village and civil parish with 1,015 inhabitants in 2001, increasing to 1,058 at the 2011 Census, located  from Burnham-on-Crouch and  from Bradwell-on-Sea, in Maldon District and the ceremonial county of Essex in England. It is one of the villages that make up the ancient Dengie Hundred, which is bounded by the River Blackwater and River Crouch.

Tillingham village is clustered around the main street with a historic centre that has been designated as a conservation area.

The village has two pubs; "The Fox and Hounds" and "The Cap and Feathers", which dates back to the 15th century.

Governance
An electoral ward in the same name exists. This ward includes Bradwell-on-Sea and had a total population at the 2011 Census of 2,182.

Facilities
There is one primary school, St Nicholas C of E primary school. There are two chapels, the Peculiar People's chapel and the Congregational Chapel, and the 14th-century parish church of St Nicholas. The Parish Church has very strong links with St Paul's Cathedral, in London.  The Corporation of the Cathedral Church of St Paul in London owns three arable farms and domestic properties in Tillingham. Links go back to, at least, the middle of the 15th Century and the Cathedral remains the patron of the Parish Church. The Peculiar People, who opened their Chapel in 1867, were renamed in the 1950s the Union of Evangelical Churches. Their chapel in Tillingham closed down around 2005.

Tillingham is also mentioned in the H. G. Wells novel The War of the Worlds. It is the place where the narrator's brother arrives at the coast following his exodus from London during the Martian invasion.

Transport
The most frequent service is the Dengie route D4 which operates to Southminster and Burnham-on-Crouch. Fords Coaches operates the fortnightly services 2 and 3 which operate lengthy journeys to Chelmsford and Southend.

The nearest railway stations are at Southminster and Burnham-on-Crouch which offer frequent services to South Woodham Ferrers, Billericay and London Liverpool Street.

References

External links

Tillingham Parish Council

Villages in Essex
Maldon District